Victor Gsovsky (12 January 1902, Saint Petersburg - 14 March 1974, Hamburg) was a Russian ballet dancer, teacher, balletmaster and choreographer.

Biography
He studied with Mariinsky Theatre prima ballerina Evgenia Sokolova and started his teaching career while still very young.

In 1925 Victor Gsovsky left Soviet Russia with his wife Tatjana Gsovsky, whom he had met in Krasnodar. Their first engagement was in Berlin, Germany, where he worked as dancer and choreographer at the Berlin State Opera (1925-1928) before opening a private school in 1928. From 1930 to 1933 he worked as a choreographer for the German UFA Film Company and undertook smaller tours with his wife and the Ballet Gsovsky.

From 1937 he was ballet master of the Markova-Dolin company; in 1938 he began teaching in Paris and in 1945 was appointed ballet master of the Paris Opera Ballet. In 1946-1947 he was ballet master with the Ballets des Champs-Élysées and again in 1948 and 1953; with the Metropolitan Ballet in London in 1947.

From 1950 to 1952 he was ballet director of the Munich State Opera. After leaving Munich he worked as a choreographer and ballet master in several European locations. He was ballet master in Düsseldorf (1964-1967) and at the Hamburg State Opera (1967–1970). He staged the first post-war production of La Sylphide for the Ballets des Champs-Élysées in 1946. His best-known work by far is the Grand Pas Classique (mus. Auber, 1949), which is still performed in galas around the world. An influential teacher, his students included Yvette Chauviré, Nina Vyroubova, Colette Marchand, Violette Verdy, and Vera Zorina.

Works 
Victor Gsovsky's choreography includes:
 Swan Lake Act II, Paris Opera, 1945
 Grand Pas Classique to the ballet music from Daniel Auber's two-act opera Le Dieu et La Bayadere, 1830, created for Yvette Chauviré and Vladimir Skouratoff in Paris, 1949
 Masquerade, music by Georges Bizet - Felix Weingartner, Théâtre des Champs-Élysées, 1946–1948 (exact date is unknown)
 La Sylphide, Théâtre des Champs-Élysées, Paris, France, 1948
 Hamlet, music by Boris Blacher (with Tatjana Gsovsky, Germany, 1950)
 Weg zum Licht, music by Georges Auric (1952, Prinzregententheater Munich, Germany)
 Pas de cœur, music by Gottfried von Einem (1952, Prinzregententheater)
Many dancing revues and divertissements.

References

1902 births
1974 deaths
Ballets Russes dancers
Dancers from Saint Petersburg
White Russian emigrants to Germany
Ballet choreographers
Male ballet dancers from the Russian Empire
Choreographers from the Russian Empire
German male ballet dancers
German choreographers
French choreographers
Emigrants from the Russian Empire to Germany
20th-century German ballet dancers